A raised vowel is a vowel sound in which the body of the tongue is raised upward and backward toward the dorsum (soft palate).

Raised vowels and retracted vowels constitute the traditional but articulatorily-inaccurate category of back vowels, but they also cover most of the central vowels.

References

Scott Moisik, Ewa Czaykowska-Higgins, & John H. Esling (2012) "The Epilaryngeal Articulator: A New Conceptual Tool for Understanding Lingual-Laryngeal Contrasts"

Vowels